Masore is a dispersed settlement in the hills along the left bank of the Idrijca River in the Municipality of Idrija in the traditional Inner Carniola region of Slovenia.

References

External links
Masore on Geopedia

Populated places in the Municipality of Idrija